Niels Roos (born 10 July 1979 in Gug near Aalborg), better known as Niarn, is a Danish rapper. Signed to Copenhagen Records, he has released five albums including the Danish chart-topping album Antihelt

Discography

Studio albums

Singles

References

Danish rappers
People from Aalborg
Living people
1979 births